Roon (Ron) is an Austronesian language spoken in West Papua Province, Indonesia.

Distribution
Ethnic Roon people reside in Yende, Niab, Inday, Sariay, Syabes, and Mena villages of Roon District, Teluk Wondama Regency.

References

South Halmahera–West New Guinea languages
Languages of western New Guinea
Papua (province) culture